Sigma Xi, The Scientific Research Honor Society is a highly prestigious, non-profit honor society for scientists and engineers. Sigma Xi was founded at Cornell University by a junior faculty member and a small group of graduate students in 1886, making it one of the oldest honor societies. Membership in Sigma Xi is by invitation only, where members nominate others on the basis of their research achievements or potential. Sigma Xi goals aim to honor excellence in scientific investigation and encourage cooperation among researchers in all fields of science and engineering.

Information about
Sigma Xi has nearly 60,000 members who were elected to membership based on their research achievements and potential. It has more than 500 chapters in North America and around the world. In addition to publishing American Scientist magazine, Sigma Xi provides grants annually to promising young researchers and sponsors a variety of programs supporting ethics in research, science and engineering education, the public understanding of science, international research cooperation and the overall health of the research enterprise. The Society is based in Research Triangle Park, North Carolina.

Today, Sigma Xi participates in a more loosely coordinated lobbying association of four of the nation's oldest and most prestigious honor societies, called the Honor Society Caucus.  Its members include Phi Beta Kappa, Phi Kappa Phi, Sigma Xi, and Omicron Delta Kappa.

Motto and name
The Greek letters "Sigma" and "Xi" form the acronym of the Society's motto,  or "Spoudon Xynones," which translates as "Companions in Zealous Research." The word 'Honor' was added to the name of the Society at the 2016 Annual Meeting. According to Sigma Xi President Tee L. Guidotti,

"Sigma Xi, of course, is our basic name and has been since the organization was founded in 1886 as the scientific and engineering counterpart to Phi Beta Kappa. Like all “Greek letter” societies, whether professional or social, it is an acronym for the motto of the organization,  (Spoudon Xynones), which translates as "companions in Zealous Research." For many years, we were referred to as “Society of the Sigma Xi.” In the early twentieth century, some in the leadership wanted “Sigma Xi” to be dropped altogether in favor of some formulation such as “Scientific Research Society of America.” In a strange quirk of history, both names survived because the organization split in the 1940s into an academic honor society (Sigma Xi) and an honor society for applied research and engineering (the Scientific Research Society of America, called RESA). RESA was a separate entity, wholly owned by Sigma Xi, and represented engineers and scientists at non-academic institutions, such as government and industrial research laboratories. In an even stranger development, Sigma Xi and RESA merged back together in 1974 and eventually began calling itself Sigma Xi, The Scientific Research Society."

William Procter Prize
The William Procter Prize is a prestigious scientific research award by the society in the name of a member, William Procter, who later also endowed this award in 1950. This award recognizes outstanding contributions to scientific research and the ability to communicate the significance of the research to scientists in other disciplines.

Notable alumni
More than 200 winners of the Nobel Prize have been Sigma Xi members, including Albert Einstein, Enrico Fermi, Richard Feynman, Linus Pauling, Francis Crick, James Watson, Barbara McClintock, John Goodenough, and Jennifer Doudna.

See also
List of Sigma Xi members
Alpha Chi Sigma, a professional fraternity specializing in the fields of the chemical sciences

References

External links

Sigma Xi's Year of Water H2008 Blog
Guide to the Sigma Xi, The Scientific Research Society Records 1928-2003

Sigma Xi
Scientific societies based in the United States
Honor societies
1886 establishments in New York (state)
Scientific organizations established in 1886
Former members of Association of College Honor Societies